Heartstrings is a 2009 British animated short film directed by Rhiannon Evans at the University of Wales in Newport. It tells us the story of two stop-motion figures made from string, who fall in love; their love is represented by a red string that connects them at the heart.

The film was made on a budget of £500 and took around four months to complete. In 2010 it was included on the Best of British Animation Awards Vol. 8 DVD.

Accolades
2009: won the Best Animated Film Award at the Newport Graduate Showcase
2009: won the Best Student Film Award at the Norwich Film Festival
2009: won the Award for Second placed film at Canterbury Anifest
2009: won the Audience Selection Award at Canterbury Anifest
2009: won the Technical Achievement Award at Canterbury Anifest
2009: won the Animation Award at Exposures Film Festival
2009: won the Grand jury Award at Exposures Film Festival
2010: won the Best in Show Award at the Savannah International Animation Festival
2010: won the Best Student Film Award at the Savannah International Animation Festival
2010: won the Best Animation Award at Screentest Festival
2010: won the Audience Award at Screentest Festival
2010: won the Best Student: Undergraduate Individual Award at Stoke Your Fires

Nominations
2010: British Animation Award for Best Student Film

References

External links
 
 Heartstrings blog

2009 films
2000s animated short films
British animated short films
2000s British films